The Inimitable Teddy Edwards is an album by saxophonist Teddy Edwards recorded in 1976 and released on the Xanadu label.

Reception

In his review for AllMusic, Scott Yanow stated "this LP is a superior outing".

Track listing
 "Sunset Eyes" (Teddy Edwards) – 10:00
 "That Old Black Magic" (Harold Arlen, Johnny Mercer) – 4:40
 "Mean to Me" (Fred E. Ahlert, Roy Turk) – 7:17
 "Imagination" (Jimmy Van Heusen, Johnny Burke) – 5:44    
 "One on One" (Edwards) – 3:38
 "Stella by Starlight" (Victor Young, Ned Washington) – 9:58

Personnel 
Teddy Edwards – tenor saxophone
Duke Jordan  – piano
Larry Ridley – bass  
Freddie Waits – drums

References 

1976 albums
Teddy Edwards albums
Xanadu Records albums
Albums produced by Don Schlitten